Zaluzhnoye is a rural locality (a selo) and the administrative center of Zaluzhenskoye Rural Settlement, Liskinsky District, Voronezh Oblast, Russia. The population was 1,970 as of 2010. There are 40 streets.

Geography 
Zaluzhnoye is located 11 km southeast of Liski (the district's administrative centre) by road. Nikolsky is the nearest rural locality.

References 

Rural localities in Liskinsky District